Charles Maclean may refer to:

Charles Fraser MacLean (1841–1924), American jurist
Sir Charles Maclean, 9th Baronet (1798–1883), 25th Chief, 1847–83
Charles Maclean, Baron Maclean (1916–1990), 27th Chief, 1936–90
Charles Rawden Maclean (1815–1880), alias "John Ross", an opponent of slavery
Charles W. MacLean (1903–1985), suffragan bishop of the Episcopal Diocese of Long Island

See also
Charles McLean (disambiguation)